Paul Biensfeldt (4 March 1869 – 2 April 1933) was a German-Jewish stage and film actor.

Selected filmography

 The Canned Bride (1915)
 The Queen's Love Letter (1916)
 Countess Kitchenmaid (1918)
 The Blue Lantern (1918)
 The Adventure of a Ball Night (1918)
 Carmen (1918)
 The Victors (1918)
 My Wife, the Movie Star (1919)
 The Bodega of Los Cuerros (1919)
 The Spies (1919)
 Harakiri (1919)
 Prince Cuckoo (1919)
 Veritas Vincit (1919)
 A Drive into the Blue (1919)
 Mascotte (1920)
 Va banque (1920)
 Romeo and Juliet in the Snow (1920)
 Sumurun (1920)
 The Hunchback and the Dancer (1920)
 The Adventuress of Monte Carlo (1921)
 Peter Voss, Thief of Millions (1921)
 The Wild Cat (1921)
 Dr. Mabuse the Gambler (1922)
 The Girl with the Mask (1922)
 The Flight into Marriage (1922)
 His Excellency from Madagascar (1922)
 Das Milliardensouper (1923)
 The Little Napoleon (1923)
 Bob and Mary (1923)
 The Stone Rider (1923)
 The Path to God (1924)
 The Little Duke (1924)
 By Order of Pompadour (1924)
 The Telephone Operator (1925)
 The Island of Dreams (1925)
 Fire of Love (1925)
 Flight Around the World (1925)
 Wood Love (1925)
 The Adventure of Mr. Philip Collins (1925)
 Cab No. 13 (1926)
 I Liked Kissing Women (1926)
 Sword and Shield (1926)
 The World Wants To Be Deceived (1926)
 Circus Romanelli (1926)
 The Fallen (1926)
 The Flight in the Night (1926)
 The Adventurers (1926)
 The Queen of Moulin Rouge (1926)
 Vienna, How it Cries and Laughs (1926)
  Carnival Magic (1927)
 Rhenish Girls and Rhenish Wine (1927)
 Svengali (1927)
 Behind the Altar (1927)
 A Serious Case (1927)
 Nameless Woman (1927)
 Suzy Saxophone (1928)
  A Girl with Temperament (1928)
  Dyckerpotts' Heirs (1928)
 Erzherzog Johann (1929)
 Her Dark Secret (1929)
 Sprengbagger 1010 (1929)
 Archduke John (1929)
 Danube Waltz (1930)
 Hocuspocus (1930)
 A Student's Song of Heidelberg (1930)
 The Flute Concert of Sanssouci (1930)
 Student Life in Merry Springtime (1931)
 The Spanish Fly (1931)
 The Beggar Student (1931)
 My Friend the Millionaire (1932)
 Madame Makes Her Exit (1932)
 A Tremendously Rich Man (1932)
 Trenck (1932)
 The White Demon (1932)
 Marshal Forwards (1932)
 Tell Me Who You Are (1933)

References

Bibliography
 Bach, Steven. Marlene Dietrich: Life and Legend. University of Minnesota Press, 2011.
 Eisner, Lotte H. The Haunted Screen: Expressionism in the German Cinema and the Influence of Max Reinhardt. University of California Press, 2008.
 Kreimeier, Klaus. The UFA Story: A Story of Germany's Greatest Film Company 1918-1945. University of California Press, 1999.

External links

1869 births
1933 deaths
19th-century German Jews
Jewish German male actors
German male film actors
German male silent film actors
German male stage actors
Male actors from Berlin
20th-century German male actors